I've Suffered a Head Injury is an EP by The Verve Pipe. It was originally released in 1992 as the band's debut album. This rare 10-track version contains two songs written by original lead guitarist Brian Stout and an acoustic recording of "The Freshmen", which the band re-recorded for its hit 1996 album Villains. Later in 1992, the band released the album in EP form on LMNO Pop. The 1995 rerelease has the same track listing as the original EP.

1992 EP/1995 Rerelease

All songs produced by Jon Frazer and The Verve Pipe.

Original 1992 10-Track Album

All songs produced by Jon Frazer and The Verve Pipe except "The Freshmen", produced and engineered by Kevin and Debby Brown.

Band members

 Brian Vander Ark - guitars and vocals
 Brian Stout - lead guitars and vocals
 Brad Vander Ark - bass and vocals
 Donny Brown - percussion and vocals 

The Verve Pipe albums
1992 debut albums
1992 EPs